is a Japanese former competitive ice dancer. A six-time Japanese national champion, she competed at five World Championships and six Four Continents Championships. His father, Shoichiro Tsuzuki, is a figure skating coach.

Career

Early years 
Tsuzuki began learning to skate in 1982. She skated at least three seasons with Akiyuki Kido, competing on the junior level. They ended their partnership  1990.

Partnership with Nakamura 
By 1991, Tsuzuki had teamed up with Kazu Nakamura to compete in the senior ranks. The duo won the Japanese national title in 1993–1994 and placed 24th at the 1994 World Championships in Chiba, Japan. They parted ways at the end of the season.

Partnership with Razgulajevs 
Later in 1994, Tsuzuki formed a partnership with Juris Razgulajevs. Winners of two Japanese national titles, they placed 5th at the 1995 NHK Trophy and 16th at the 1996 World Championships in Edmonton, Alberta, Canada.

Partnership with Farkhoutdinov 
Tsuzuki teamed up with Rinat Farkhoutdinov around 1998. Early in their partnership, they were coached by Natalia Dubova and Viktor Ryzhkin.

After winning the Japanese national title, Tsuzuki/Farkhoutdinov placed 6th at the 1999 Four Continents Championships in Halifax, Nova Scotia, Canada, and 20th at the 1999 World Championships in Helsinki, Finland.

They repeated as national champions the following season. The two placed 7th at the 2000 Four Continents Championships in Osaka, Japan, and then 18th at the 2000 World Championships in Nice, France.

By the 2000–2001 season, Tsuzuki/Farkhoutdinov had changed coaches to Tatiana Tarasova and Nikolai Morozov in Newington, Connecticut. After competing at their first Grand Prix assignments, they finished 7th at the 2001 Four Continents Championships in Salt Lake City, Utah, United States, and 24th at the 2001 World Championships in Vancouver, British Columbia, Canada.
 
The duo appeared at two more Grand Prix events. The Skate Canada International in November 2001 was their final competition together.

Partnership with Miyamoto 
In mid-2003, Tsuzuki teamed up with Kenji Miyamoto. During their three-season partnership, they competed together at six Grand Prix events and placed in the top ten at three Four Continents Championships. They were coached by Muriel Zazoui in Lyon, France.

Tsuzuki retired from competitive skating following the 2005–2006 season.

Programs

With Miyamoto

With Farkhoutdinov

Results 
GP: Champions Series / Grand Prix

With Miyamoto

With Farkhoutdinov

With Razgulajevs

With Nakamura

With Kido

References

External links 

 
 
 Nakako Tsuzuki / Kenji Miyamoto at Tracings.net

Japanese female ice dancers
1975 births
Living people
Sportspeople from Tokyo